Within geographic information systems, Place syntax is a term in spatial analysis. There is potential in combining geographically oriented accessibility research and geometrically oriented research in architecture, such as space syntax, as stated by for example, Ståhle et al.

References

External links 
Place Syntax: Geographic accessibility with axial lines in GIS

Geographic information systems